Below are the rosters for the 2003 FIFA Women's World Cup tournament in the United States. The 16 national teams involved in the tournament were required to register a squad of up to 20 players, including at least two goalkeepers. Only players in these squads were eligible to take part in the tournament. The final squads were published by FIFA on 13 September 2003.

Group A

Nigeria
Head coach: Samuel Okpodu

North Korea
Head coach: Ri Song-gun

North Korea only named a squad of 19 players, leaving the number 4 shirt unassigned.

Sweden
Head coach: Marika Domanski-Lyfors

United States
Head coach: April Heinrichs

Group B

Brazil
Head coach: Paulo Gonçalves

France
Head coach: Élisabeth Loisel

Norway
Head coach: Åge Steen

South Korea
Head coach: An Jong-goan

Group C

Argentina
Head coach: Carlos Borrello

Canada
Head coach:  Even Pellerud

Germany
Head coach: Tina Theune-Meyer

Japan
Head coach: Eiji Ueda

Group D

Australia
Head coach: Adrian Santrac

China PR
Head coach: Ma Liangxing

Ghana
Head coach: Oko Aryee

Russia
Head coach: Yuri Bystritsky

References

FIFA Women's World Cup 2003 - Teams
FIFA Women's World Cup USA 2003 - Technical Report
Sweden caps and goals

External links
 
 

Squads
FIFA Women's World Cup squads